Richard Luca Rosa da Silva Sousa (born 6 January 1998), known as Richard Luca or simply Richard, is a Brazilian professional footballer who most recently played as a forward for Canadian club Cavalry FC.

Club career

Goiás
In 2013, Richard Luca played for Goiás' U-15 side, where he scored 27 goals in 22 appearances. On 12 March 2016, he made his senior debut for Goiás as a 60th-minute substitute in a Campeonato Goiano match against Atlético Goianiense.

Santos
On 20 September 2016, Richard Luca signed a three-year contract with Brazilian giants Santos. While at Santos, he played in the Copa São Paulo de Futebol Júnior and was scouted by FC Barcelona.

Tigres UANL
On 13 April 2018, Richard Luca signed with Liga MX side Tigres UANL.

Correcaminos
On 11 June 2018, Richard Luca was loaned to Ascenso MX side Correcaminos. He made ten league appearances in the Apertura that season, before returning to Tigres in November 2018.

Torpedo Kutaisi
In early 2019, Richard Luca was loaned to Georgian Erovnuli Liga side Torpedo Kutaisi. He made thirteen league appearances that season, scoring three goals, and scored a brace in one Georgian Cup appearance.

Aparecidense
On 2 December 2019, after turning down offers from Europe, Richard Luca was loaned to his hometown club, Aparecidense, so that he could be closer to his family.

Cavalry FC
On 19 February 2020, Richard Luca signed for Canadian Premier League side Cavalry FC, but was unable to join the team that season due to the COVID-19 pandemic. On 4 December 2020, he re-signed to a multi-year contract. After the 2021 season, Cavalry announced that Luca would leave the club after two seasons.

International career
In 2013, Richard Luca played for the Brazilian U15 team, scoring two goals in fourteen appearances.

Personal life
Richard Luca grew up in the Vale do Sol area of Aparecida de Goiânia, Goiás State.

Career statistics

References

External links

1998 births
Living people
Association football forwards
Brazilian footballers
Sportspeople from Goiânia
Brazilian expatriate footballers
Expatriate footballers in Mexico
Brazilian expatriate sportspeople in Mexico
Expatriate footballers in Georgia (country)
Brazilian expatriate sportspeople in Georgia (country)
Expatriate soccer players in Canada
Brazilian expatriate sportspeople in Canada
Goiás Esporte Clube players
Santos FC players
Tigres UANL footballers
Correcaminos UAT footballers
FC Torpedo Kutaisi players
Associação Atlética Aparecidense players
Cavalry FC players
Ascenso MX players
Erovnuli Liga players
Canadian Premier League players
Brazil youth international footballers